The 1963-64 Central Professional Hockey League season was the first season of the Central Professional Hockey League, a North American minor pro league. Five teams participated in the regular season, and the Omaha Knights won the league title.

Regular season

Playoffs

External links
 Statistics on hockeydb.com

CPHL
Central Professional Hockey League seasons